Rebetiko, plural rebetika, occasionally transliterated as rembetiko or rebetico, is a term used today to designate originally disparate kinds of urban Greek music which have come to be grouped together since the so-called rebetika revival, which started in the 1960s and developed further from the early 1970s onwards. Rebetiko briefly can be described as the urban popular song of the Greeks, especially the poorest, from the late 19th century to the 1950s.

In 2017 rebetiko was added in the UNESCO Intangible Cultural Heritage Lists.

Definition and etymology 

The word  (plural ) is an adjectival form derived from the Greek word . The word  is today construed to mean a person who embodies aspects of character, dress, behavior, morals and ethics associated with a particular subculture. The etymology of the word  remains the subject of dispute and uncertainty; an early scholar of rebetiko, Elias Petropoulos, and the modern Greek lexicographer Giorgos Babiniotis, both offer various suggested derivations, but leave the question open. The earliest source of the word to date is to be found in a Greek-Latin dictionary published in Leiden, Holland in 1614 where the word  is defined as a 'wanderer', 'blind', 'misguided', etc.

Musical bases 
Although nowadays treated as a single genre, rebetiko is, musically speaking, a synthesis of elements of European music, the music of the various areas of the Greek mainland and the Greek islands, Greek Orthodox ecclesiastical chant, often referred to as Byzantine music, and the modal traditions of Ottoman art music and café music.

Melody and harmony 

However, the majority of rebetiko songs have been accompanied by instruments capable of playing chords according to the Western harmonic system, and have thereby been harmonized in a manner which corresponds neither with conventional European harmony, nor with Ottoman art music, which is a monophonic form normally not harmonized. Furthermore, rebetika has come to be played on instruments tuned in equal temperament, in direct conflict with the more complex pitch divisions of the  system.

During the later period of the rebetiko revival there has been a cultural entente between Greek and Turkish musicians, mostly of the younger generations. One consequence of this has been a tendency to overemphasize the  aspect of rebetiko at the expense of the European components and, most significantly, at the expense of perceiving and problematizing this music's truly syncretic nature.

However it is important to note in this context that a considerable proportion of the rebetiko repertoire on Greek records until 1936 was not dramatically different, except in terms of language and musical "dialect", from Ottoman café music (played by musicians of various ethnic backgrounds) which the mainland Greeks called Smyrneika. This portion of the recorded repertoire was played almost exclusively on the instruments of /Ottoman café music, such as kanonaki, santouri, politikí lyra,  (actually identical with the Hungarian cimbalom, or the Romanian țambal), and clarinet.

Scales 
The scales used in rebetiko music are the traditional western major and minor scales, as well as a series of eastern makams, influenced by the Ottoman classical music. Some of them include rast, uşşâk, hijaz (or "phrygian dominant scale"),  and nahawand.

Rhythms 
Most rebetiko songs are based on traditional Greek or Anatolian dance rhythms. Most common are:
 Syrtos, a general name for many Greek dances (including the Nisiotika), (mostly a  meter in various forms)
 Hasaposervikos, including various kinds of Greek music. It is also the fast version of hasapiko (like  and  meter)
 Hasapiko, a  meter and the fast version hasaposerviko in a  meter
 Antikristos or Karsilamas and argilamas (a  meter)
 Tsifteteli, cheerful dance for women (a )
 Bolero, in a few songs, mainly for guitar (a )

Various other rhythms are used too.

Taxim 
There is one component within the rebetiko tradition which is common to many musical styles within Eastern musical spheres. This is the freely improvised unmeasured prelude, within a given /, which can occur at the beginning or in the middle of a song.

Instruments
The first rebetiko songs to be recorded, as mentioned above, were mostly in Ottoman/Smyrna style, employing instruments of the Ottoman tradition. During the second half of the 1930s, as rebetiko music gradually acquired its own character, the bouzouki began to emerge as the emblematic instrument of this music, gradually ousting the instruments which had been brought over from Asia Minor.

The bouzouki 

The bouzouki was apparently not particularly well-known among the refugees from Asia Minor, but had been known by that name in Greece since at least 1835, from which year a drawing by the Danish artist Martinus Rørbye has survived. The drawing clearly shows a number of bouzouki-like instruments. Despite this evidence, we still know nothing of the early history of the instrument's association with what came to be called rebetiko. Recent research has however uncovered a number of hitherto unknown references to the instrument during the 19th and early 20th centuries, including evidence of its established presence in the Peloponnese.

Although known in the rebetiko context, and often referred to in song lyrics, well before it was allowed into the recording studio, the bouzouki was first commercially recorded not in Greece, but in America, in 1926, when the Peloponnesian musician Konstandinos Kokotis (1878 – after 1948) recorded two Peloponnesian folk songs with the accordionist Ioannis Sfondilias. This recording, reissued for the first time in 2013, reveals a "folk" melodic style never recorded before or since. The first recording to feature the instrument clearly in a recognisable somewhat more "modern" melodic role, was made in 1929, in New York. Three years later the first true bouzouki solo was recorded by Ioannis Halikias, also in New York, in January 1932.

In Greece the bouzouki had been allowed into a studio for the very first time a few months previously, in October 1931. In the hands of Thanassis Manetas (1870-ca 1943), together with the  player Yiannis Livadhitis, it can be heard accompanying the singers Konstantinos Masselos, aka Nouros, and Spahanis, on two discs, three songs in all.

These early commercial recordings in America and in Greece had however been preceded by a group of documentary recordings, consisting of one shellac 78 rpm disc and five wax cylinders, made in Görlitz, Germany in July 1917, during WWI. The amateur bouzouki player Konstandinos Kalamaras accompanied a professional Byzantine singer, Konstandinos Vorgias, and an amateur singer, Apostolos Papadiamantis. These three men were among 6500 Greek soldiers interned as guests of Germany in an ex-POW camp in the small town of Görlitz at the Polish border, from September 1916 until their release in February 1919.

It was not until October 1932, in the wake of the success of Halikias' New York recording, which immediately met with great success in Greece, that Markos Vamvakaris made his first recordings with the bouzouki. These recordings marked the real beginning of the bouzouki's recorded career in Greece, a career which continues unbroken to the present day.

Other instruments 
The core instruments of rebetiko, from the mid-1930s onwards, have been the bouzouki, the baglamas and the guitar. Other instruments included accordion, politiki (Constantinopolitan) lyra (sometimes other lyra were used), clarinet, kanonaki, oud, santur, violin and finger-cymbals. Other instruments heard on rebetiko recordings include: double bass, laouto, mandola, mandolin and piano. In some recordings, the sound of clinking glass may be heard. This sound is produced by drawing worry beads against a fluted drinking glass, originally an ad hoc and supremely effective rhythmic instrument, probably characteristic of teké and taverna milieux, and subsequently adopted in the recording studios.

Lyrics 
Like several other urban subcultural musical forms such as the blues, flamenco, fado, bal-musette and tango, rebetiko grew out of particular urban circumstances. Often its lyrics reflect the harsher realities of a marginalized subculture's lifestyle. Thus one finds themes such as crime, drink, drugs, poverty, prostitution and violence, but also a multitude of themes of relevance to Greek people of any social stratum: death, eroticism, exile, exoticism, disease, love, marriage, matchmaking, the mother figure, war, work, and diverse other everyday matters, both happy and sad.

A perhaps over-emphasized theme of rebetiko is the pleasure of using drugs (cocaine, heroin- etc.), but especially hashish. Rebetiko songs emphasizing such matters have come to be called , although musically speaking they do not differ from the main body of rebetiko songs in any particular way.

Culture 

Rebetiko is closely related with nightlife entertainment: ouzeri, taverna (Greek tavern) and night centres.

Rebetiko is also sometimes related with the icon of mangas, which means strong guy  that "needs correction", a social group in the Belle Époque era's counterculture of Greece (especially of the great urban centers: Athens, Piraeus, and Thessaloniki).

Mangas was a label for men belonging to the working class, behaving in a particularly arrogant/presumptuous way, and dressing with a very typical vesture composed of a woolen hat, a jacket (they usually wore only one of its sleeves), a tight belt (used as a knife case), stripe pants, and pointy shoes. Other features of their appearance were their long moustache, their bead chaplets (sing. ), and their idiosyncratic manneristic limp-walking. A related social group were the Koutsavakides (sing. ); the two terms are occasionally used interchangeably.

History 

Initially a music associated with the lower classes, rebetiko later reached greater general acceptance as the rough edges of its overt subcultural character were softened and polished, sometimes to the point of unrecognizability. Then, when the original form was almost forgotten, and its original protagonists either dead, or in some cases almost consigned to oblivion, it became, from the 1960s onwards, a revived musical form of wide popularity, especially among younger people of the time.

Origins 
Rebetiko probably originated in the music of the larger, mainly coastal cities in today's Asia Minor with large Greek communities during the Ottoman era. In these cities the cradles of rebetiko were likely to be the ouzeri, the hashish dens with hookahs, coffee shops and even the prison. In view of the paucity of documentation prior to the era of sound recordings it is difficult to assert further facts on the very early history of this music. There is a certain amount of recorded Greek material from the first two decades of the 20th century, recorded in Constantinople/Istanbul, in Egypt and in America, of which isolated examples have some bearing on rebetiko, such as in the very first case of the use of the word itself on a record label. But there are no recordings from this early period which give an inkling of the local music of Piraeus such as first emerged on disc in 1931 (see above).

Smyrna style 

During the early 20th century, the main centre of rebetiko music was the multi-national port of Smyrna (modern Izmir) in Asia Minor. The musicians of Smyrna were influenced not only from the eastern sounds inside the Ottoman empire, but also from the European-style music of the many European communities of the city, most notably the Italians. Smyrneiki Estudiantina was a group of musicians playing popular music for Greeks worldwide. After the Great fire of Smyrna many of them (Panagiotis Toundas, Spyros Peristeris, Giorgos Vidalis, Anestis Delias and others) fled to Greece contributing to the development of the rebetiko style music in Greece.

1922–1932 

In the wake of the Asia Minor Catastrophe and the population exchange of 1923, huge numbers of refugees settled in Piraeus, Thessaloniki, Volos  and other harbor cities. They brought with them both European and Anatolian musical instruments and musical elements, including Ottoman café music, and, often neglected in accounts of this music, a somewhat Italianate style with mandolins and choral singing in parallel thirds and sixths.

Many of these Greek musicians from Asia Minor were highly competent musicians. Initially an "Athenean Estudiantina" was established with Giorgos Vidalis and some musicians of the old Smyrneiki Estudiantina. Other musicians became studio directors (A&R men) for the major companies, for example Spyros Peristeris (who played mandolin, guitar, piano and later bouzouki), Panagiotis Toundas (primarily a mandolinist) and the violin virtuoso Giannis Dragatsis (Oghdhondakis). The musical personalities of Peristeris and Toundas in particular came to have enormous influence on the further development of recorded rebetiko. While from the middle of the 1920s a substantial number of Anatolian-style songs were recorded in Greece, examples of Piraeus-style rebetiko song first reached shellac in 1931 (see above).

1930s 

During the 1930s, the relatively sophisticated musical styles met with, and cross-fertilised, with the more heavy-hitting local urban styles exemplified by the earliest recordings of Markos Vamvakaris and Batis.

This historical process has led to a currently used terminology intended to distinguish between the clearly Asia Minor oriental style, often called "", and the bouzouki-based style of the 1930s, often called Piraeus style. Also, the use of mandolin totally vanished.

By the end of the 1930s rebetiko had reached what can reasonably be called its classic phase, in which elements of the early Piraeus style, elements of the Asia Minor style, clearly European and Greek folk music elements, had fused to generate a genuinely syncretic musical form. Simultaneously, with the onset of censorship, a process began in which rebetiko lyrics slowly began to lose what had been their defining underworld character. This process extended over more than a decade.

Metaxas censorship, new directions 

In 1936, the 4th of August Regime under Ioannis Metaxas was established and with it, the onset of censorship. Some of the subject matter of rebetiko songs was now considered disreputable and unacceptable. During this period, when the Metaxas dictatorship subjected all song lyrics to censorship, song composers would rewrite lyrics, or practice self-censorship before submitting lyrics for approval. The music itself was not subject to censorship, although proclamations were made recommending the "Europeanisation" of the regarded outcoming Anatolian music, which led to certain radio stations banning  in 1938, i.e. on the basis of music rather than lyrics. This was, however, not bouzouki music. The term , (sing. , Gr. , sing. ) refers to a kind of improvised sung lament, in ummeasured time, sung in a particular /. The  were perhaps the most pointedly oriental kind of songs in the Greek repertoire of the time.

References to drugs and other criminal or disreputable activities now vanished from recordings made in Greek studios, to reappear briefly in the first recordings made at the resumption of recording activity in 1946. In the United States, however, a flourishing Greek musical production continued, with song lyrics apparently unaffected by censorship, (see below) although, strangely, the bouzouki continued to be rare on American recordings until after WWII.

It is notable that Rebetiko music was also rejected by the Greek Left because of its "reactionary" (according to the Communist Party of Greece) and subculture character and the drug references.

Postwar period 
Recording activities ceased during the Axis occupation of Greece during World War II (1941–1944), and did not resume until 1946; that year, during a very short period, a handful of uncensored songs with drug references were recorded, several in multiple versions with different singers.

The scene was soon popularized further by stars like Vassilis Tsitsanis. His musical career had started in 1936, and continued during the war despite the occupation. A musical genius, he was both a brilliant bouzouki player and a prolific composer, with hundreds of songs to his credit. After the war he continued to develop his style in new directions, and under his wing, singers such as Sotiria Bellou, Ioanna Georgakopoulou, Stella Haskil and Marika Ninou made their appearance. Tsitsanis developed the "westernization" of the rebetiko and made it more known to large sections of the population, setting also the bases for the future laiko.

In 1948 Manos Hatzidakis shook the musical establishment by delivering his legendary lecture on rebetiko, until then with heavy underworld and cannabis use connections and consequently looked down upon. Hatzidakis focused on the economy of expression, the deep traditional roots and the genuineness of emotion displayed in rembetika, and exalted the likes of composers like Markos Vamvakaris and Vassilis Tsitsanis. Putting theory into practice, he adapted classic rembetika in his 1951 piano work, Six Folk Paintings (Έξι Λαϊκές Ζωγραφιές), which was later also presented as a folk ballet.

Parallel to the post-war career of Tsitsanis, the career of Manolis Chiotis took rebetiko and the Greek popular music in more radically new directions. Chiotis developed much more the "europeanisation/westernization" of the rebetiko. In 1953 he added a fourth pair of strings to the bouzouki, which allowed it to be played as a guitar and set the stage for the future 'electrification' of rebetiko.

Chiotis was also a bold innovator, importing Latin and South American rhythms (such as flamenco, rumba, mambo etc.), and concentrating on songs in a decidedly lighter vein than the characteristic ambiance of rebetiko songs. Perhaps most significantly of all, Chiotis, himself a virtuoso not only on the bouzouki but on guitar, violin and oud, was responsible for introducing and popularizing the modified 4-stringed bouzouki in 1956.

A comparable development also took place on the vocal side. In 1952 a young singer named Stelios Kazantzidis recorded a couple of rebetika songs that were quite successful. Although he would continue in the same style for a few years it was quickly realized, by all parties involved, that his singing technique and expressive abilities were too good to be contained within the rebetiko idiom. Soon well-known composers of rebetika—like Kaldaras, Chiotis, Klouvatos—started to write songs tailored to Stelios powerful voice and this created a further shift in rebetika music. The new songs had a more complex melodic structure and were usually more dramatic in character. Kazantzidis went on to become a star of the emerging laiki music.

Kazantzidis, however, did not only contribute to the demise of classical rebetika (of the Piraeus style that is). Paradoxically, he was also one of the forerunners of its revival. In 1956 he started his cooperation with Vassilis Tsitsanis who, in addition to writing new songs for Kazantzidis, also gave him some of his old ones to reinterpret. Kazantzidis, thus, sung and popularized such rebetika classics as "" (Clouded Sunday), "" and "". These songs, and many others, previously unknown to the wider public, suddenly became cherished and sought-after.

At about the same time many of the old time performers—both singers and bouzouki players—abandoned the musical scene of Greece. Some of them died prematurely (Haskil, Ninou), others emigrated to the US (Binis, Evgenikos, Tzouanakos, Kaplanis), while some quit music life for other work (Pagioumtzis, Genitsaris). This, of course, created a void which had to be filled with new blood. In the beginning the new recruits—like for example Dalia, Grey and Kazantzidis—stayed within the bounds of classical rebetica. Soon, however, their youthful enthusiasm and different experiences found expression in new stylistic venues which eventually changed the old idiom.

This combined situation contributed, during the 1950s, to the almost total eclipse of rebetiko by other popular styles.

The term in its turn derives from the word  which translates best as 'the people'.

The revival 

The first phase of the rebetiko revival can perhaps be said to have begun around 1960. In that year the singer Grigoris Bithikotsis recorded a number of songs by Markos Vamvakaris, and Vamvakaris himself made his first recording since 1954. During the same period, writers such as Elias Petropoulos began researching and publishing their earliest attempts to write on rebetiko as a subject in itself. The bouzouki, unquestioned as the basic musical instrument of rebetiko music, now began to make inroads into other areas of Greek music, not least due to the virtuosity of Manolis Chiotis. From 1960 onwards prominent Greek composers such as Mikis Theodorakis and Manos Hatzidakis employed bouzouki virtuosi such as Manolis Chiotis, Giorgos Zambetas, and Thanassis Polyhandriotis in their recordings.

The next phase of the rebetiko revival can be said to have started in the beginning of the 1970s, when LP reissues of 78 rpm recordings, both anthologies and records devoted to individual artists, began to appear in larger numbers. This phase of the revival was initially, and is still to a large extent, characterized by a desire to recapture the style of the original recordings, whereas the first phase tended to present old songs in the current musical idiom of Greek popular music, . Many singers emerged and became popular during this period. It was during the 1970s that the first work which aimed at popularizing rebetiko outside the Greek language sphere appeared and the first English-language academic work was completed.

During the 1970s a number of older artists made new recordings of the older repertoire, accompanied by bouzouki players of a younger generation. Giorgios Mouflouzelis, for example, recorded a number of LPs, though he had never recorded during his youth in the 78 rpm era. The most significant contribution in this respect was perhaps a series of LPs recorded by the singer Sotiria Bellou, who had had a fairly successful career from 1947 onwards, initially under the wing of Tsitsanis. These newer recordings were instrumental in bringing rebetiko to the ears of many who were unfamiliar with the recordings of the 78 rpm era, and are still available today as CDs.

An important aspect of the revival of the late 1960s and early 1970s was the element of protest, resistance and revolt against the military dictatorship of the junta years. This was perhaps because rebetiko lyrics, although seldom directly political, were easily construed as subversive by the nature of their subject matter and their association in popular memory with previous periods of conflict.

Rebetiko in its original form was revived during the Junta of 1967–1974, when the Regime of the Colonels banned it. After the end of the Junta, many revival groups (and solo artists) appeared. The most notable of them include Opisthodhromiki Kompania, Rembetiki Kompania, Babis Tsertos, Agathonas Iakovidis and others.

Giorgos Dalaras in 1975 decided to release his own renditions of rebetiko songs on the double LP 50  (50 , 50 Years of Rebetiko Songs). The recording proved an immediate success, despite the toning down of the lyrics. However, as a result, a new movement was set to take place in Greek music, and the once forgotten  were finding themselves performing, in some cases for the first time in 30 to 40 years. He followed up this work with an LP in 1980,  (Rebetiko (songs) of the occupation), which was a more gritty and meaty release, more faithful to the tone of the original rebetika as heard in the 1930s. However, again references to drugs were cut out, and only mentioned in passing. Unlike the previous double LP, this one contained some of the original musicians, Bayianteras and Genitsaris in particular making an appearance on the album.

Modern times 
Today, rebetiko songs are still popular in Greece, both in contemporary interpretations which make no attempt to be other than contemporary in style, and in interpretations aspiring to emulate the old styles. The genre is a subject of growing international research, and its popularity outside Greece is now well-established.

Some of the musicians and singers of the genre include Babis Tsertos, Babis Goles and Agathonas Iakovidis.

In 2012, Vinicio Capossela released his music album .

In the United States 

Greek emigration to the United States started in earnest towards the end of the 19th century. From then onwards, and in the years following the Asia Minor Disaster, until immigration became restricted in the mid-1920s, a great number of Greeks emigrated to the United States, bringing their musical traditions with them. American companies began recording Greek music performed by these immigrants as early as 1896. The first Greek-American recording enterprises made their appearance in 1919. From the latter years of the second decade of the century there exist a number of recordings that can be considered as rebetiko, a few years before such songs began to appear on recordings in Greece.

The music industry in the United States came to play a particular role from the mid-1930s onwards in recording rebetiko lyrics which would not have passed the censors in Greece. This phenomenon came to repeat itself during the period of the Greek military junta of 1967–1974. A notable example of American recording studios permitting some 'bolder' lyrics can be found in the LP  (When They Smoke The Hookah) by Apostolos Nikolaidis, released in 1973. Releasing this album in Greece, with its overt references to various aspects of drug use, would have been impossible at that time. It is worth noting, however, that the censorship laws invoked in Greece by Metaxas were never officially revoked until 1981, seven years after the fall of the junta. A further characteristic of American Greek recordings of the time was the recording of songs in the Anatolian musical styles of rebetiko, which continued in the United States well into the 1950s. Even songs originally recorded with typical bouzouki-baglamas-guitar accompaniment could appear in Anatolian garments.

After WWII, beginning in the early 1950s, many Greek rebetiko musicians and singers traveled from Greece to tour the United States, and some stayed for longer periods. Prominent among them were Ioannis Papaioannou, Manolis Chiotis, Vassilis Tsitsanis, Iordanis Tsomidis, Roza Eskenazi, Stratos Pagioumtzis, Stavros Tzouanakos and Giannis Tatasopoulos, of whom the latter three died in the United States.

Rebetiko rock

Rebetiko rock is a music genre that fuses the elements of rock music and rebetiko. Hard rock and the Greek folk music are also a major influence on rebetiko rock.

Performers of rebetiko on 78 rpm recordings

Discography 
Much rebetiko is issued in Greece on CDs which quickly go out of print. Since the 1990s a considerable number of high quality CD productions of historical rebetiko have been released by various European and American labels. The following select discography includes some of these historical anthologies, which are likely to be available in English speaking countries, plus a few Greek issues. All are CDs unless otherwise noted. The emphasis on English-language releases in this discography is motivated both by their consistently high sound quality and by their inclusion, in many cases, of copious information in English, which tends to be lacking in Greek issues. See however link section below for one Greek source of historic CDs with website and notes in English.

 Apostolos Hadzichristos – A Unique Greek Voice, (4CD), JSP Records, 2011.
 From Tambouras to Bouzouki The History and Evolution of the Bouzouki and its First Recordings (1926–1932), Orpheum Phonograph ORPH-01 , 2013.
 Great Voices of Constantinople 1927–1933, Rounder Records, 1997.
 Greek-Oriental Rebetica-Songs & Dances in the Asia Minor Style:The Golden Years, Arhoolie Records, 1991.
 Greek Rhapsody – Instrumental Music from Greece 1905–1956, (2CD & book) Dust-To-Digital DTD-27, 2013.
 Marika Papagika – Greek Popular and Rebetic Music in New York 1918–1929, Alma Criolla Records, 1994.
 Markos Vamvakaris, Bouzouki Pioneer, 1932–1940, Rounder Records, 1998.
 Markos Vamvakaris, Master of Rembetika – Complete Recordings 1932–1937, plus selected recordings 1938, (4CD), JSP Records, 2010
 Mortika – Rare Vintage Recordings from a Greek Underworld, ARKO records, Uppsala, 2005. CD and book, also issued as 2LP box by Mississippi Records, 2009.
 Mourmourika: Songs of the Greek Underworld, Rounder Records, 1999.
 My Only Consolation: Classic Pireotic Rembetica 1932–1946, Rounder Records, 1999.
 Rembetica: Historic Urban Folk Songs From Greece, Rounder Records, 1992.
 Rembetika: Greek Music from the Underground, JSP Records, 2006.
 Rembetika 2: More of the Secret History of Greece's Underground Music, JSP Records, 2008.
 Rebetiki Istoria, EMIAL-Lambropoulos, Athens 1975–76 – LP series in six volumes, later also issued on cassettes and CDs.
 Roza Eskenazi – Rembetissa, Rounder Records, 1996.
 The Rough Guide to Rebetika, World Music Network, 2004.
 Vassilis Tsitsanis – All the pre-war recordings, 1936–1940 (5CD), JSP Records, 2008.
 Vassilis Tsitsanis – The Postwar Years 1946–1954, (4CD), JSP Records, 2009.
 Women of Rembetica, Rounder Records, 2000.
 Women of Rembetika, (4CD), JSP Records, 2012.
 Various – The Diaspora Of Rembetiko, Network Medien, (2CD), compilation, 2004

See also 
Byzantine music
Hasapiko
Mangas
Rembetiko – a film by Costas Ferris
Syrtaki – fast version of Hasapiko

Notes

References

Further reading 
 Katharine Butterworth & Sara Schneider, eds. Rebetika – Songs from the Old Greek Underworld. Athens: Aiora Press, 2014.
 Stathis Damianakos. Κοινωνιολογία του Ρεμπέτικου, 2nd edn. (“The Sociology of Rebetiko”). Athens: Plethron, 2001.
 Stathis Gauntlett. ‘Between Orientalism and Occidentalism: The contribution of Asia Minor refugees to Greek popular song, and its reception’, in: Crossing the Aegean: an appraisal of the 1923 compulsory population exchange between Greece and Turkey, ed. R. Hirschon, Berghahn, Oxford & New York, 247–260, 2003.
 .
 Stathis Gauntlett, ‘The Diaspora Sings Back: Rebetika Down Under’, in: Greek Diaspora and Migration since 1700, ed. Dimitris Tziovas. Ashgate, 2009.
 Manos Hatzidakis, Ερμηνεία και θέση του ρεμπέτικου τραγουδιού (The interpretation and position of rebetiko song, in Greek), 1949.
 Gail Holst-Warhaft, Road to rembetika: music from a Greek sub-culture, songs of love, sorrow and hashish. Athens: Denise Harvey & Company,.

 Nikos Kotarides, Ρεμπέτες και ρεμπέτικο τραγούδι (Rebetes and rebetiko song). Athens: Plethron, 1996.
 Dionysis Maniatis, Η εκ περάτων δισκογραφία γραμμοφώνου (I Ek Peraton Diskografia Grammofonou – The complete gramophone discography), Athens 2006.

 Panagiotis Kounades, Εις ανάμνησιν στιγμών ελκυστικών (“In memory of charming moments”). Athens: Katarti, 2000.
 Nikos Ordoulidis, "The Greek popular modes", in: British Postgraduate Musicology 11 (December 2011).
 Risto Pekka Pennanen, "The Nationalisation of Ottoman Popular Music in Greece", in: Ethnomusicology, vol. 48, no. 1 (Winter 2004), pp. 1–25.
 Elias Petropoulos, Rebetika: songs from the Old Greek Underworld, translated by John Taylor, illustrated by Alekos Fassianos. London: Alcyon Art Editions, 1992. .
 David Prudhomme, Rébétiko (La mauvaise herbe), Futuropolis, 2009. .
 John Taylor, ‘The Rebetic Songs’, in: Maledicta, vol. 5, nos. 1–2 (Summer-Winter 1981), pp. 25–30.
 Markos Vamvakaris, Autobiography. Trans. Noonie Minogue and published by Greeklines.

External links 

Markos Vamvakaris Autobiography for the first time in English
A unique live recording of Markos Vamvakaris
Se Xrono Rebetiko Kai Laiko (Audio file) A weekly syndicated Greek radio show on Rebetika hosted by Photi Sotiropoulos and written by Vlassis Kokonis
Rebetiko On-line Offers a brief introduction in Greek and English, and a large photo collection. Listening facility at present disabled (7th Jan 2010)
Rembetiko Forum A forum about the Rebetiko Music with many discussions containing valuable information.
Tous aux Balkans: Rebetiko songs lyrics and videos, further useful links
Original History of Greek rebetico An official introduction in Greek, of Rebetico history
Rebetiko and folk music wiki (in Greek)
 Listen to an example of Rebeticka from Australia on australianscreen online

 
Greek music
Greek words and phrases
Urban street dance and music
Drug culture
Cannabis music
Underground culture
Maqam-based music tradition
Intangible Cultural Heritage of Humanity
Folk music genres